Kleinblittersdorf is a village and a municipality in the district of Saarbrücken, in Saarland, Germany. It is situated on the river Saar, opposite Grosbliederstroff in France, approx. 10 km south of Saarbrücken.

References

Divided cities
Saarbrücken (district)